San Joaquin (Spanish: San Joaquín, meaning "St. Joachim") is a city in Fresno County, California, United States. The population was 4,001 at the 2010 census, up from 3,270 at the 2000 census. The nearest high school in the area is Tranquillity High School in Tranquillity.

Etymology
San Joaquin was named for the San Joaquin River.

Geography

History
The first post office opened in San Joaquin in 1913. San Joaquin incorporated in 1920.

Demographics

2010
At the 2010 census San Joaquin had a population of 4,001. The racial makeup of San Joaquin was 1,966 (49.1%) White, 31 (0.8%) African American, 54 (1.3%) Native American, 37 (0.9%) Asian, 0 (0.0%) Pacific Islander, 1,766 (44.1%) from other races, and 147 (3.7%) from two or more races. Hispanic or Latino of any race were 3,825 persons (95.6%).

The whole population lived in households, no one lived in non-institutionalized group quarters and no one was institutionalized.

There were 882 households, 660 (74.8%) had children under the age of 18 living in them, 601 (68.1%) were opposite-sex married couples living together, 163 (18.5%) had a female householder with no husband present, 51 (5.8%) had a male householder with no wife present.  There were 47 (5.3%) unmarried opposite-sex partnerships, and 1 (0.1%) same-sex married couples or partnerships. 48 households (5.4%) were one person and 20 (2.3%) had someone living alone who was 65 or older. The average household size was 4.54.  There were 815 families (92.4% of households); the average family size was 4.66.

The age distribution was 1,652 people (41.3%) under the age of 18, 428 people (10.7%) aged 18 to 24, 1,100 people (27.5%) aged 25 to 44, 646 people (16.1%) aged 45 to 64, and 175 people (4.4%) who were 65 or older.  The median age was 23.6 years. For every 100 females, there were 103.0 males.  For every 100 females age 18 and over, there were 106.6 males.

There were 934 housing units at an average density of ,of which 882 were occupied, 406 (46.0%) by the owners and 476 (54.0%) by renters.  The homeowner vacancy rate was 1.9%; the rental vacancy rate was 6.3%.  1,997 people (49.9% of the population) lived in owner-occupied housing units and 2,004 people (50.1%) lived in rental housing units.

2000
At the 2000 census there were 3,270 people in 702 households, including 636 families, in the city. The racial makeup of the city was 35.44% White, 0.21% Black or African American, 1.56% Native American, 3.61% Asian, 53.73% from other races, and 5.44% from two or more races.  91.99% of the population were Hispanic or Latino of any race.
Of the 702 households 67.9% had children under the age of 18 living with them, 70.9% were married couples living together, 12.5% had a female householder with no husband present, and 9.3% were non-families. 6.7% of households were one person and 4.1% were one person aged 65 or older.  The average household size was 4.66 and the average family size was 4.79.

The age distribution was 41.2% under the age of 18, 14.2% from 18 to 24, 27.9% from 25 to 44, 12.7% from 45 to 64, and 4.0% 65 or older.  The median age was 22 years. For every 100 females, there were 113.6 males.  For every 100 females age 18 and over, there were 114.3 males.

The median income for a household in the city was $24,934, and the median family income  was $25,441. Males had a median income of $20,382 versus $16,023 for females. The per capita income for the city was $6,607.  About 33.9% of families and 34.6% of the population were below the poverty line, including 41.1% of those under age 18 and 23.7% of those age 65 or over.

Government
San Joaquin utilizes a council–manager form of government and uses a city council with five council members that appoints the mayor. As of March 2022, the current mayor of San Joaquin is Julia Hernandez.

Education
In a county dominated by the agriculture industry, San Joaquin residents mostly work on farms. The city suffers from poverty, and poor educational standards and achievements. According to New York Times columnist David Brooks, only "2.9 percent of the residents have bachelor’s degrees and 20.6 percent have high school degrees." Brooks believes these factors will prevent long-term economic development and poverty alleviation.

References

External links

Incorporated cities and towns in California
Cities in Fresno County, California
Populated places established in 1920
1920 establishments in California